Hoplolichoides conicotuberculatus is a species of lichid trilobites belonging to the family Lichidae. These fast-moving low-level epifaunal carnivores lived in the Middle Ordovician (abt. 470 Ma) of Russia.

References

 David J Hollowaya, Alan T Thomasb - Hoplolichoides, Allolichas, Autoloxolichas and Akantharges, and the classification of lichid trilobites

Lichida
Ordovician trilobites
Fossils of Russia